Events in the year 1985 in Cameroon.

Incumbents
 President – Paul Biya

Events
 The Cameroon National Union changes its name to the Cameroon People's Democratic Movement.

Births
 4 March – Annabelle Ali, wrestler
 16 July – Rebecca Muambo, wrestler

References

 
1980s in Cameroon
Years of the 20th century in Cameroon
Cameroon
Cameroon